Kamar-Taj is a fictional location appearing in American comic books published by Marvel Comics. It first appeared in Strange Tales #110 (July 1963) and was created by Stan Lee and Steve Ditko.  The name "Kamar-Taj" does not appear in early Lee/Ditko Doctor Strange stories, but was created later as the country's backstory was fleshed out.

Description
Kamar-Taj is "a hidden land high in the Himalayas" and the homeland of Doctor Strange's mentor, the Ancient One, and of the evil sorcerer Kaluu. Strange's majordomo Wong also stems from a family of monks living in Kamar-Taj.

Over 500 years ago, the man who would one day become the Ancient One was born in Kamar-Taj. With his friend Kaluu, he discovered the power of magic but the two friends disagreed on how to use it to protect their village.  Kaluu sought to conquer neighboring villages and build a large empire.  The two cast a spell eliminating sickness, disease and age from Kamar-Taj and shortly afterwards Kaluu was crowned king by the villagers under Kaluu's mind-control spell. The Ancient One tried to stop Kaluu and in their battle the village of Kamar-Taj was wiped out. Kaluu was banished to an alternate dimension.  The Ancient One left Kamar-Taj and traveled the Earth for centuries, battling evil creatures, gaining the Amulet of Agamotto and the Book of the Vishanti.

He finally settled down in the Himalaya Mountains near Kamar-Taj, building a palace as his home with an order of monks to protect and assist him. In a tournament organized by the sorcerer Aged Genghis, the Ancient One won the title of Earth's Sorcerer Supreme. He took a student, who would one day become Mister Jip, but banned him from his home when he found out the student had been studying the forbidden books to increase his own power.

Feeling himself getting older and weaker, the Ancient One set out to find a student. He taught such beings as Doctor Druid and Baron Mordo but found his true apprentice in Stephen Strange, claiming that this boy would become the new Sorcerer Supreme. Mordo began to plot against Strange, though the Ancient One kept protecting him. Mordo soon left the palace and Stephen became the Ancient One's successor. The Ancient One would often assist Stephen, until Shuma-Gorath killed the Ancient One's physical body.

In other media
In the 2016 film Doctor Strange, Wong is depicted as one of the Masters of Mystic Arts, tasked with protecting some of Kamar-Taj's most valuable relics and books. Actor Benedict Wong was pleased with the changes made to the character, and described him as "a drill sergeant to Kamar-Taj" rather than a manservant, who does not practice martial arts in the film, another racial stereotype. Co-writer C. Robert Cargill said that the location of Kamar-Taj was shifted from Tibet to Nepal to prevent censorship by the Chinese government. In the film, in Kathmandu, the sorcerer Kaecilius and his zealots enter the secret compound Kamar-Taj and murder its librarian, keeper of ancient and mystical texts. They steal a forbidden ritual from a book in the personal library of Ancient One, a sorcerer who has lived for an unknown time and taught all at Kamar-Taj, including Kaecilius, in the ways of the mystic arts.
Kamar-Taj also appeared in Doctor Strange in the Multiverse of Madness (2022). As Strange takes America Chavez to Kamar-Taj, the Masters of the Mystic Arts fortify the place in preparation for Wanda Maximoff's assault with a magical shield and various other defenses. However, Maximoff's telepathy targets a sorcerer and disables their magic, causing the shield to collapse, allowing her to destroy Kamar-Taj's resistance. In the end, after Maximoff's defeat, Kamar-Taj is rebuilt again and Chavez begins her training in the mystic arts.

Further reading
"Kamar-Taj: Doctor Strange's Mystical Training Grounds Explained" by Bob Chipman, Screen Rant (Sept 29, 2016)
"Doctor Strange Filming Locations In Nepal: 'How You Can Find Your Own Kamar'-Taj" by Patricia Sim, Travelers Today (Nov 4, 2016)

See also 
 Shangri-La

References

Fictional Asian countries
Marvel Comics countries